Newton's theorem may refer to:

Newton's theorem (quadrilateral)
Newton's theorem about ovals
Newton's theorem of revolving orbits
Newton's shell theorem